Charlotte Booth (née Taylor born 14 August 1985) is an English rower who competed in the 2016 Summer Olympics.

Rowing career
She was part of the British team that topped the medal table at the 2015 World Rowing Championships at Lac d'Aiguebelette in France, where she won a silver medal as part of the lightweight double sculls with Katherine Copeland.

Booth and Copeland took part in the lightweight women's double scull in the 2016 Olympic Games, coming 14th.

References

Living people
1985 births
English female rowers
British female rowers
World Rowing Championships medalists for Great Britain
Rowers at the 2016 Summer Olympics
Olympic rowers of Great Britain